Ohlsdorf is a municipality in the district of Gmunden in the Austrian state of Upper Austria.

Population

References

Cities and towns in Gmunden District